The 2007–08 Bulgarian Cup was the 26th official edition of the Bulgarian annual football tournament. The final match between PFC Litex Lovech and PFC Cherno More Varna was held on 14 May 2008 at Vasil Levski National Stadium in Sofia. Litex won their third Bulgarian Cup in their history after winning the match 1-0 thanks to a second-half goal from Stanislav Manolev.

First round
In this round entered winners from the preliminary rounds together with the teams from B Group.

|-
!colspan=3 style="background-color:#D0F0C0;" |12 October 2007

|-
!colspan=3 style="background-color:#D0F0C0;" |13 October 2007

|}

Second round
This round featured winners from the First Round and all teams from A Group. 

|-
!colspan=3 style="background-color:#D0F0C0;" |31 October 2007

|}

Third round

|-
!colspan=3 style="background-color:#D0F0C0;" |5 December 2007

|-
!colspan=3 style="background-color:#D0F0C0;" |12 December 2007

|}

Quarter-finals

|-
!colspan=5 style="background-color:#D0F0C0;" |12 March 2008

|}

Semi-finals

|-
!colspan=5 style="background-color:#D0F0C0;" |16 April 2008

|}

Final

Details

See also
 2007–08 A Group
 2007–08 B Group

References

Bulgarian Cup seasons
2007–08 domestic association football cups
Cup